Ram: Part 1 is an upcoming Indian Malayalam-language action thriller film written and directed by Jeethu Joseph. It stars Mohanlal in the title role alongside an ensemble cast  including Trisha, Indrajith Sukumaran, Samyuktha Menon, Adil Hussain, Durga Krishna, Prachi Tehlan, Anoop Menon, Saikumar, Suman, Chandhunadh, and Siddique. Vishnu Shyam, a protege of veteran Vidyasagar, composes the film's music.

Principal photography of the film began on 6 January 2020. After a schedule break in February, filming was halted for around three years due to the COVID-19 pandemic. During the delay, Jeethu scaled-up the film's size. It resumed filming in August 2022.

Premise
Ram Mohan, a former R&AW operative who went rogue, is called back to deal with Bael, a terrorist organization which possesses nuclear weapons capable of destroying India.

Cast

 Mohanlal
 Trisha
 Indrajith Sukumaran 
 Samyuktha Menon
 Durga Krishna 
 Anoop Menon
 Suman 
 Prachi Tehlan
 Siddique
 Sai Kumar
 Vinay Forrt
 Chandhunadh as Vivek, a journalist
 Suresh Chandra Menon as Sreenivas
 Adil Hussain
 Simarjeet Singh Nagra
 Priyanka Nair
 Kalabhavan Shajohn
 Anjali Nair 
 Leona Lishoy
 Anant Mahadevan 
 G. Suresh Kumar 
 Krishna 
 Shobhi Thilakan
 Tosh Christy
 Santhosh Keezhattoor 
 Hima Shankar
 Santhi Priya

Production

Development
Jeethu Joseph began the pre-production work of Ram by late 2019 at the same time he was overseeing the post-production work of The Body and Thambi. In September 2019, it was reported that Mohanlal and Trisha would be starring in Jeethu's high-budget thriller film produced by Chennai-based Abhishek Films, to be shot in India and abroad, with filming set to begin in November lasting 100 days. Filming date was pushed to late December to begin during the releasing week of Thambi. Jeethu described the film as an action-thriller with a story spanning several countries. A pooja function for the film and a press meet was held on 16 December 2019, where the film's title was revealed. While interacting with the press, Jeethu said he was approached by the producers three years ago to make a second film with Mohanlal after Drishyam (2013), "I was tensed about doing another film with Lalettan (Mohanlal) because it's a huge responsibility. It took me three years to come up with the right subject".

Casting
Mohanlal reportedly plays a R&AW agent in the film. During the casting process, Trisha was suggested for the role by Mohanlal. Trisha plays one of the lead roles in the film. She plays Vineetha, a doctor. Mohanlal also suggested Prachi Tehlan for a role, who was in talks in January 2020. Tehlan reportedly joined the film that month. Anoop Menon also joined in January. Chandhunadh plays Vivek, a journalist. Adil Hussain was cast in a brief but crucial role, while Indrajith Sukumaran was cast in a role with ample screen time. Suresh Chandra Menon was cast in the role of a villain. Durga Krishna played the character of Meera in the first schedule of filming. Meera is sister to Vineetha. David John, who had contested in the Mohanlal-hosted reality TV show Bigg Boss was cast in a negative role, he was suggested by Mohanlal. Samyuktha Menon joined the film's shoot in September 2022 at London. Her character was created after the film was scaled-up after the schedule break due to the COVID-19 pandemic. Priyanka Nair also joined the shoot in London.

Filming
Principal photography began on 6 January 2020. First phase of filming took place at Ernakulam. Another schedule in Dhanushkodi was completed on 20 February. The film was also shot in Delhi and Shimla. The film had completed its shoot in India in February. However, their plans to shoot the film in other countries for the remaining portions was hindered by the COVID-19 pandemic, which would delay the production for two years. In May that year, Jeethu said the filming would resume in the United Kingdom and Uzbekistan once the virus spread is controlled. Meanwhile, he decided to move on to another film which can be shot entirely in Kerala. Editing of Ram began in November along with the post-production work of Drishyam 2 (2021). Till then, ₹14 crore was spent on the film and needed another ₹14 crore to complete filming, as per the estimate at that time. Due to prolonged restrictions due to the COVID-19 pandemic in the UK, at one time they thought of shifting location to France, since it was costlier, they decided to wait until the restrictions are lifted. They also wanted to shoot the film in the Middle East for which location scouting begin in May 2022. Jeethu scaled up the size of the film during the pandemic break. As per media reports, Ram has been split into a two-part film. Jeethu told that Ram was the most expensive film he had done till then.

For the remaining schedule, Jeethu started location scouting in mid-2022. London, Tunisia Morocco and Israel were picked, with filming set to begin in mid-August 2022. After almost three years of halt, filming resumed on 6 August 2022 at Ernakulam for a 10-day schedule. Mohanlal, Indrajith, and Trisha performed in these portions. Filming was shifted to London following that. London schedule was held in September. Hollywood stunt director Peter Pedrero choreographed the action scenes, he joined the film in October in London. London scheduled is planned for 40 days.

Music
Vishnu Shyam, a disciple of composer Vidyasagar, makes his debut as a music director in the film. The lyrics for songs were written by Vinayak Sasikumar.

Release
Before production, Ram was planned as to release in Onam 2020. With filming delayed due to the COVID-19 pandemic, in May 2022, Jeethu said that they want to release the film in theatres itself and that is why they pushed the shooting dates to get the desired locations.

References

External links 
 

Upcoming films
Upcoming Malayalam-language films
Indian action thriller films